Al-Harith ibn Adnan (perhaps the same as Akk) is the brother of Ma'ad ibn Adnan, who is an ancestor of the Islamic prophet Muhammad. He is featured in ancient Arabic literature.

Parentage

Some say that Ma'ad ibn Adnan had a brother called Al-Dith, and that he was actually Akk. However, others say that Akk was the son of Al-Dith, and thus a grandson of Adnan. Nevertheless, the majority agree that Akk and Al-Dith are the same person, the son of Adnan.

If Akk and Al-Dith are the same person, then his mother and the mother of Ma'ad ibn Adnan were the same.

Tribe
Akk dwelt in the Yaman because he took a wife amongst the Asharites and lived with them, adopting their language. The Asharites were descended from Saba' ibn Yashjub ibn Ya'rub ibn Qahtan.

Akk was the founder of a Southern Arabian tribe, the tribe of Akk. According to the following verse, the mother of Madhij (the founder of another Southern tribe that settled in Jordan) was from Akk:Woe to the mother of Madhij from Akk!
(That is the mother of Madhij weeping) 

Some genealogists say that Akk departed for Samran, in the Yemen, leaving his brother Ma'ad. This is because, when the people of Hadur killed Shu'ayb b. Dhi Mahdam al- Haduri, God sent Nebuchadnezzar II against them as a punishment. Armiya and Barkhiya went away taking Ma'ad with them, and when the warfare had died down they took him back to Mecca. Ma'ad then found that his brothers and uncles who were descended from Adnan had joined the peoples of the Yemen and had intermarried with them; the Yemenites had been sympathetic to them because they were descendants of Jurhum. They quote the following verse as proof of this story:We left our brothers, al-Dith and Akk 
on their way to Samran, and they departed quickly. 
They were of the Banu Adnan, 
but they lost this descent irrevocably among themselves.

See also
Qahtan
Adnan
Ahl al-Bayt
Family tree of Muhammad
Family tree of Shaiba ibn Hashim
Banu Hashim
Banu Quraysh
Banu Kinanah
Banu Mudhar

References

Semitic-speaking peoples
Adnanites
Ancient Arabs